Dipelicus bidens, is a species of dung beetle native to India and Sri Lanka.

Description
This small subquadrate, highly convex species has an average length of about 5 to 6 mm. Body black, and shiny. Antennae, and mouthparts are red in color with yellowish antennal club. Head densely and rugosely punctured. Elytra trapezoidal. Elytra finely striate with very strong widely spaced punctures. Bilobate pygidium with wide borders. 

Male genitalia curved in shape with phallobase. Paramere curved with the pointed and triangular apex. There is a small ridge present across paramere. Stridulatory ridges of propygidium very coarse anteriorly.

References 

Scarabaeinae
Insects of Sri Lanka
Insects of India
Insects described in 1910